The men's 500 metres races of the 2014–15 ISU Speed Skating World Cup 4, arranged in the Thialf arena in Heerenveen, Netherlands, were held on the weekend of 12–14 December 2014.

Race one was won by Pavel Kulizhnikov of Russia, while Artur Waś of Poland came second, and Laurent Dubreuil of France came third. Pim Schipper of the Netherlands won Division B of race one, and was thus, under the rules, automatically promoted to Division A for race two. Christian Oberbichler of Austria set a new national record for the second straight weekend.

Kulizhnikov and Waś also took the first two places in race two, while Jan Smeekens of the Netherlands came third. Yūya Oikawa of Japan won Division B of race two.

Race 1
Race one took place on Friday, 12 December, with Division B scheduled in the morning session, at 12:40, and Division A scheduled in the afternoon session, at 17:22.

Division A

Division B

Notes: NR = national record.

Race 2
Race two took place on Sunday, 14 December, with Division B scheduled in the morning session, at 12:09, and Division A scheduled in the afternoon session, at 16:29.

Division A

Division B

References

Men 0500
4